The 2016–17 Creighton Bluejays men's basketball team represented Creighton University in the 2016–17 NCAA Division I men's basketball season. The Bluejays, led by seventh-year head coach Greg McDermott, played their home games at the CenturyLink Center Omaha, as members of the Big East Conference. They finished the season 25–10, 10–8 in Big East play to finish in a four-way tie for third place. In the Big East tournament, they defeated Providence and Xavier before losing to Villanova in the championship game. They received an at-large bid to the NCAA tournament as a No. 6 seed in the Midwest region. There they lost in the first round to No. 11-seeded Rhode Island.

Previous season
The Bluejays finished the 2015–16 season 20–15, 9–9 in Big East play to finish in sixth place in conference. They lost to Seton Hall in the quarterfinals of the Big East tournament. They received an invitation to the National Invitation Tournament where they beat Alabama in the first round and Wagner in the second round before losing to BYU in the quarterfinals.

Preseason
Prior to the season, Creighton was picked to finish third in a poll of Big East coaches.  Maurice Watson Jr. was selected to the preseason All-Big East first team. Marcus Foster received an Honorable Mention.

Departures

Incoming Transfers

2016 recruiting class

2017 Recruiting class

Roster

Schedule and results

|-
!colspan=9 style=| Exhibition

|-
!colspan=9 style=| Regular season

|-
!colspan=9 style=|Big East tournament

|-
!colspan=9 style=|2017 NCAA tournament

Rankings

*AP does not release post-NCAA tournament rankings

References

Creighton
Creighton Bluejays men's basketball seasons
Creighton
2016 in sports in Nebraska
2017 in sports in Nebraska